ATILA is a finite element analysis software package developed for the analysis of two and three dimensional mechanical structures that contain active piezoelectric & magnetostrictive materials. It is organized around a strong electrical/mechanical coupling and a strong fluid/structure coupling. ATILA is used in many applications including underwater acoustic, seismic, non-destructive testing, medical imaging, RF telecommunications.

References 

Structural analysis
Dimensional analysis